The Conservative Party of Canada, colloquially known as the Tories, is a federal political party in Canada. It was formed in 2003 by the merger of the two main right-leaning parties, the Progressive Conservative Party (PC Party) and the Canadian Alliance, the latter being the successor of the Western Canadian-based Reform Party. The party sits at the centre-right to the right of the Canadian political spectrum, with their federal rival, the Liberal Party of Canada, positioned to their left. The Conservatives are defined as a "big tent" party, practising "brokerage politics" and welcoming a broad variety of members, including "Red Tories" and "Blue Tories".

From Canadian Confederation in 1867 until 1942, the original Conservative Party of Canada participated in numerous governments and had multiple names. However, by 1942, the main right-wing Canadian force became known as the Progressive Conservative Party. In the 1993 federal election, the PC Party's Western Canadian support transferred to the Reform Party. When it became clear that neither the PC Party nor the Reform Party/Canadian Alliance could beat the incumbent Liberals that governed since the 1993 election, an effort to unite the right-of-centre parties emerged. In 2003, the Canadian Alliance and the PCs merged, forming the Conservative Party of Canada.

During the Conservative Party's governance of Canada from 2006 to 2015, its economic decisions included reducing sales tax, reducing income taxes, reducing business taxes, balancing the national budget, creating the tax-free savings account (TFSA), and creating the Universal Child Care Benefit. In social policy, the government eliminated the long-gun registry, introduced mandatory minimum sentences for violent crimes, raised the age of consent to 16 years of age, permitted the construction of several pipelines, and withdrew Canada from the Kyoto Protocol. The government also supported the State of Israel, negotiated the Comprehensive Economic and Trade Agreement (CETA), and negotiated the Trans-Pacific Partnership (TPP).

Under its first leader, Stephen Harper, the party governed with two minority governments after the federal elections of 2006 and 2008. It then won a majority government in the 2011 federal election before being defeated in the 2015 federal election by a majority Liberal government led by Justin Trudeau. Under its second and third leaders, Andrew Scheer and Erin O'Toole, the party remained in opposition after losing the elections in 2019 and 2021, respectively. On September 10, 2022, Pierre Poilievre was elected as leader in the 2022 leadership election.

History

Predecessors

The Conservative Party is political heir to a series of right-of-centre parties that have existed in Canada, beginning with the Upper Canada Tories of the nineteenth century. John A. Macdonald and George-Étienne Cartier later founded the Liberal-Conservative Party. The party became known simply as the Conservative Party after 1873, and the Progressive Conservative Party after 1942. Like its historical predecessors and conservative parties in some other Commonwealth nations (such as the Conservative Party of the United Kingdom), members of the present-day Conservative Party of Canada are sometimes referred to as "Tories". The modern Conservative Party of Canada is also legal heir to the heritage of the historical conservative parties by virtue of assuming the assets and liabilities of the former Progressive Conservative Party upon the merger of 2003.

In 1984, the Progressive Conservative Party's electoral fortunes made a massive upturn under its new leader, Brian Mulroney, who mustered a large coalition of westerners irritated over the Liberal government's National Energy Program, suburban and small-town Ontarians, and soft Quebec nationalists who were angered over Quebec not having distinct status in the Constitution of Canada signed in 1982. This led to a huge landslide victory for the Progressive Conservative Party.

In the late 1980s and 1990s, federal conservative politics became split by the creation of a new western-based protest party, the populist and social conservative Reform Party of Canada created by Preston Manning, the son of an Alberta Social Credit premier, Ernest Manning. Westerners reportedly felt betrayed by the federal Progressive Conservative Party, seeing it as catering to Quebec and urban Ontario interests over theirs. In 1989, Reform made headlines in the political scene when its first member of Parliament (MP), Deborah Grey, was elected in a by-election in Alberta, which was a shock to the PCs, who had almost complete electoral dominance over the province for years. Another defining event for western conservatives was when Mulroney accepted the results of an unofficial Senate election held in Alberta, which resulted in the appointment of a Reformer, Stanley Waters, to the Senate. 

In the 1993 election, support for the Progressive Conservative Party collapsed, and the party's representation in the House of Commons dropped from an absolute majority of seats to only two. Meanwhile, the Reform Party took Western Canada and became the dominant conservative party in Canada. The problem of the split on the right was accentuated by Canada's single member plurality electoral system, which resulted in numerous seats being won by the Liberal Party, even when the total number of votes cast for PC and Reform Party candidates was substantially in excess of the total number of votes cast for the Liberal candidate.

Foundation and early history

In 2003, the Canadian Alliance (formerly the Reform Party) and Progressive Conservative parties agreed to merge into the present-day Conservative Party.

On October 15, 2003, after closed-door meetings were held by the Canadian Alliance and Progressive Conservative Party, Stephen Harper (then the leader of the Canadian Alliance) and Peter MacKay (then the leader of the Progressive Conservatives) announced the "'Conservative Party Agreement-in-Principle", thereby merging their parties to create the new Conservative Party of Canada. After several months of talks between two teams of emissaries, consisting of Don Mazankowski, Bill Davis and Loyola Hearn on behalf of the PCs, and Ray Speaker, Senator Gerry St. Germain and Scott Reid on behalf of the Alliance, the deal came to be.

On December 5, 2003, the agreement-in-principle was ratified by the membership of the Alliance by a margin of 96 percent to 4 percent in a national referendum conducted by postal ballot. On December 6, the PC Party held a series of regional conventions, at which delegates ratified the Agreement-in-Principle by a margin of 90% to 10%. On December 7, the new party was officially registered with Elections Canada. Senator John Lynch-Staunton, a PC, was named interim leader, pending the outcome of the party's inaugural leadership election.

The merger process was opposed by some elements in both parties. In the PCs in particular, the merger process resulted in organized opposition, and in a substantial number of prominent members refusing to join the new party. Former leadership candidate David Orchard argued that his written agreement with Peter MacKay, which had been signed a few months earlier at the 2003 Progressive Conservative Leadership convention, excluded any such merger. Orchard announced his opposition to the merger before negotiations with the Canadian Alliance had been completed. Over the course of the following year, Orchard led an unsuccessful legal challenge to the merger of the two parties.

In October and November, during the course of the PC party's process of ratifying the merger, three sitting Progressive Conservative MPs — André Bachand, John Herron and former prime minister Joe Clark — announced they would not join the new Conservative Party caucus. In the months following the merger, Rick Borotsik, who had been elected as Manitoba's only PC, became openly critical of the new party's leadership, while former leadership candidate Scott Brison and former Alliance leadership candidate Keith Martin left the party. Brison, Herron and Martin ran for the Liberal Party in the next election, while Clark, Bachand and Borotsik retired. Three senators — William Doody, Norman Atkins, and Lowell Murray — declined to join the new party and continued to sit in the upper house as a rump caucus of Progressive Conservatives, and a fourth (Jean-Claude Rivest) soon left to sit as an independent. In February 2005, Prime Minister Paul Martin appointed two anti-merger Progressive Conservatives, Nancy Ruth and Elaine McCoy, to the Senate. In March 2006, Nancy Ruth joined the new Conservative Party.

Inaugural leadership election

In the immediate aftermath of the merger announcement, some Conservative activists hoped to recruit former Ontario premier Mike Harris for the leadership. Harris declined the invitation, as did New Brunswick premier Bernard Lord and Alberta premier Ralph Klein. Outgoing Progressive Conservative leader Peter MacKay also announced he would not seek the leadership, as did former Democratic Representative Caucus leader Chuck Strahl. Jim Prentice, who had been a candidate in the 2003 PC leadership contest, entered the Conservative leadership race in mid-December but dropped out in mid-January because of an inability to raise funds so soon after his earlier leadership bid.

In the end, there were three candidates in the party's first leadership election: former Canadian Alliance leader Stephen Harper, former Magna International CEO Belinda Stronach, and former Ontario provincial PC Cabinet minister Tony Clement. Voting took place on March 20, 2004. A total of 97,397 ballots were cast. Harper won on the first ballot with 56.2% of the vote; Stronach received 34.5%, and Clement received 9.4%.

Stephen Harper (2004–2015)

In opposition (2004–2006) 
Two months after Harper's election as leader, Prime Minister Paul Martin called a general election for June 28, 2004.

For the first time since the 1993 election, a Liberal government would have to deal with an opposition party that was generally seen as being able to form government. The Liberals attempted to counter this with an early election call, as this would give the Conservatives less time to consolidate their merger. During the first half of the campaign, polls showed a rise in support for the new party, leading some pollsters to predict the election of a minority Conservative government. Momentum stalled after several Conservative candidates made controversial remarks about homosexuality, official bilingualism and abortion, allowing the Liberal Party to warn of a "hidden agenda". Ultimately, Harper's new Conservatives emerged from the election with a larger parliamentary caucus of 99 MPs while the Liberals were reduced to a minority government of 135 MPs, twenty short of a majority.

In 2005, some political analysts such as former Progressive Conservative pollster Allan Gregg and Toronto Star columnist Chantal Hébert suggested that the then-subsequent election could result in a Conservative government if the public were to perceive the Tories as emerging from the party's founding convention (then scheduled for March 2005 in Montreal) with clearly defined, moderate policies with which to challenge the Liberals. The convention provided the public with an opportunity to see the Conservative Party in a new light, appearing to have reduced the focus on its controversial social conservative agenda. It retained its fiscal conservative appeal by espousing tax cuts, smaller government, and more decentralization by giving the provinces more taxing powers and decision-making authority in joint federal-provincial programs. The party's law and order package was an effort to address rising homicide rates, which had gone up 12% in 2004.

On November 24, 2005, Harper introduced a motion of no confidence which, with the backing of the other two opposition parties, passed on November 28, 2005. This resulted in an election scheduled for January 23, 2006. The Conservatives started off the first month of the campaign by making a series of policy-per-day announcements, which included a Goods and Services Tax reduction and a child-care allowance. These announcements played to Harper's strengths as a policy wonk, as opposed to the 2004 election and summer 2005 where he tried to overcome the perception that he was cool and aloof. Though his party showed only modest movement in the polls, Harper's personal approval numbers, which had always trailed his party's significantly, began to rise. In addition, the party also received more newspaper endorsements than in 2004.

On January 23, 2006, the Conservatives won 124 seats, compared to 103 for the Liberals. The results made the Conservatives the largest party in the 308-member House of Commons, enabling them to form a minority government.

In government (2006–2015) 

On February 6, 2006, Harper and his Cabinet were sworn in. The Conservative Party confronted the In and Out scandal, regarding improper election spending during the 2006 election. The government's first budget produced a nearly $14 billion surplus, a number slightly greater than the Martin government. The budget also drastically increased military spending and scrapped funding for the Kyoto Protocol and the Kelowna Accord. Later, the government introduced the tax-free savings account (TFSA). The government passed the Veterans' Bill of Rights, which guaranteed benefits for veterans from Veterans Affairs Canada, in addition to guaranteeing equality of veterans and referring to them as "special citizens". The government also passed the Québécois nation motion which would "recognize Quebec as a nation within a united Canada." Despite its social conservative past in the Canadian Alliance, the government did not attempt to reverse the same-sex marriage law implemented by the Martin government nor did it attempt to make changes to abortion laws.

Deadlock between the Conservatives and the Liberals, the New Democratic Party, and the Bloc Québécois led to the calling of the October 2008 federal election, in which the Conservatives won a stronger minority. Shortly after, the Conservatives fought off a vote of non-confidence by a potential governing coalition of opposition parties by proroguing parliament. In his second term, Harper's government responded to the recession of 2007–2008 by introducing the Economic Action Plan that implemented major personal income tax cuts. However, these tax cuts, along with increases in spending to combat the financial crisis, grew the deficit to $55.6 billion – Canada's largest federal deficit up to that time.

A March 2011 non-confidence vote that found the Harper government to be in contempt of Parliament dissolved Parliament and triggered an election. In this election, the Conservatives won a majority government. The Harper government withdrew Canada from the Kyoto Protocol and repealed the long-gun registry. In foreign policy, the government passed the Anti-terrorism Act, launched Operation Impact to combat ISIL, negotiated the Comprehensive Economic and Trade Agreement (CETA) with the European Union, and negotiated the Trans-Pacific Partnership (TPP). The Conservatives also gained controversy surrounding the Canadian Senate expenses scandal and the Robocall scandal; the latter involved robocalls and real-person calls that were designed to result in voter suppression in the 2011 election. In economic policy, the government launched Canada's Global Markets Action Plan to generate employment opportunities for Canadians by expanding Canadian businesses and investment in other countries, and balanced the budget in the 2014 federal budget, producing a minor deficit of $550 million.

In the 2015 federal election, after nearly a decade in power, the Conservatives suffered a landslide defeat at the hands of Justin Trudeau and his Liberal Party. Harper stepped down as leader on the election day on October 19. Journalist John Ibbitson of The Globe and Mail described Harper as "the most conservative leader Canada has ever known."

In opposition (2015–present)

First interim leadership (2015–2017)

Following the election of the Liberals and Harper's resignation as party leader in the 2015 election, it was announced that an interim leader would be selected to serve until a new leader could be chosen. That was completed at the caucus meeting of November 5, 2015 where Rona Ambrose, MP for Sturgeon River—Parkland and a former cabinet minister, was elected by a vote of MPs and Senators.

Some members of the party's national council were calling for a leadership convention as early as May 2016 according to Maclean's magazine. However, some other MPs wanted the vote to be delayed until the spring of 2017. On January 19, 2016, the party announced that a permanent leader will be chosen on May 27, 2017.

Andrew Scheer (2017–2020) 

On September 28, 2016, former Speaker of the House of Commons Andrew Scheer announced his bid for the leadership of the party. On May 27, 2017, Scheer was elected as the second permanent leader of the Conservative Party of Canada, beating runner up MP Maxime Bernier and more than 12 others with 50.95% of the vote through 13 rounds.

Under Scheer, the Conservatives prioritized repealing the Liberal government's carbon tax, pipeline construction, and balancing the budget within five years had they formed government in 2019. Scheer is a social conservative; he is personally pro-life and opposes same-sex marriage, though like Harper, he stated he wouldn't overturn the legality of both laws.

The Conservative Party entered the October 2019 federal election campaign neck-in-neck with the Liberals after the SNC-Lavalin affair earlier that year involving Justin Trudeau, but the election resulted in a Liberal minority government victory. The Conservatives did, however, win the largest share of the popular vote, and gained 26 seats. Notably, they won every single seat in Saskatchewan and all but one in Alberta. While the Conservative Party has historically been highly successful in Alberta and Saskatchewan, some point to a growing sense of Western alienation to explain the results. Following the election, Scheer faced criticism from within the party for failing to defeat Trudeau, who gained criticism for his handling of the SNC-Lavalin affair and for his wearing of brownface and blackface; the latter incident was made public during the election campaign. Scheer announced his pending resignation on December 12, 2019, after the CBC reported that the Conservative party had been paying part of his children's private school tuition. He remained party leader, until his successor was chosen in August 2020.

Erin O'Toole (2020–2022) 

A leadership election to replace Scheer was held in 2020, which was won by former Veterans Affairs Minister Erin O'Toole on August 24, 2020.

Though running for the leadership on a "true blue" platform, O'Toole started to nudge the Conservative Party to the political centre as leader. Despite campaigning against the Liberal government's carbon tax during his leadership campaign, O'Toole reversed his position in April 2021, instead advocating for a low carbon savings account. O'Toole is pro-choice and supports same-sex marriage, positions heavily different from his two predecessors as leader.

Prime Minister Trudeau called the September 2021 federal election in the hopes of winning a majority government, though in the middle of the campaign O'Toole's Conservatives were neck and neck, if not slightly ahead of the Liberals in the polls. During the campaign, O'Toole stated he would balance the budget within the next 10 years and reversed his support for repealing the Liberal government's "assault-style" weapons ban. In a similar manner to the 2019 election, the Conservatives again won the popular vote but fell short of gaining the largest amount of seats, enabling the Liberal Party under Justin Trudeau to form another minority government.

As a result, party members were undecided on whether he should continue as leader. On October 5, the Conservative caucus voted to adopt the provisions of the Reform Act, giving caucus the power to trigger a leadership review. O'Toole denied that it represented a threat to his leadership, insisting that the caucus was united as a team and that, as a supporter of the Act, he had encouraged his caucus to adopt all of its provisions.

On January 31, 2022, Conservative Calgary Heritage MP Bob Benzen submitted a letter with signatures from 35 Conservative MPs calling for a leadership review on O'Toole's leadership to the Conservative caucus chair, Scott Reid. In the letter, Benzen criticized O'Toole's reversal on repealing the Liberal government's carbon tax and assault weapons ban. On February 2, 2022, O'Toole was voted out as leader by a margin of 73 to 45 votes.

Second interim leadership (2022)
Then-deputy leader of the Conservative Party Candice Bergen was elected interim leader the same day O'Toole was ousted. Bergen's position as interim leader is set to last only a few months as a new leadership election is scheduled to be held. Conservative MP and former cabinet minister Pierre Poilievre, Conservative MP and former leadership candidate Leslyn Lewis, Independent (formerly Progressive Conservative) Member of Ontario Provincial Parliament Roman Baber, former leader of the now-defunct Progressive Conservative Party of Canada and former Premier of Quebec Jean Charest, former MP, former leader of the Progressive Conservative Party of Ontario, and Mayor of Brampton Patrick Brown, former Conservative MP Leona Alleslev, former BC MLA and Conservative MP Marc Dalton, and former Huntsville mayor and Conservative MP Scott Aitchison have announced their candidacies for the leadership. On May 2, 2022, the Party announced that the six verified candidates for the leadership would be Aitchison, Baber, Brown, Charest, Lewis, Poilievre. 

On July 6, 2022, the Party announced that Patrick Brown had been disqualified "due to 'serious allegations of wrongdoing' that 'appear' to violate Canadian election law." In response, Brown hired lawyer Marie Henein, who requested the Party's dispute resolution appeal committee be convened.

Pierre Poilievre (2022–present) 
On September 10, 2022, it was announced that Pierre Poilievre won the leadership on the first ballot.

Principles and policies
As a relatively young party with a mixed political heritage and history, the federal Conservatives are often described as a "big tent" party in a similar manner to the federal Canadian Liberals by encompassing members and voters who hold a variety of philosophies, ideas and stances, albeit sitting within the centre-right to the right-wing of the political spectrum. Broadly, the party is defined as practicing the Canadian model of conservatism and fiscal conservatism. Some political observers have noted the two most dominant wings of the party traditionally represented Red Tory and Blue Tory ideologies, whereas others have argued that the party has become less internally defined by these labels and that the terms tend to be used by outsiders. Other smaller but visible factional beliefs espoused by individuals within the party have been described by media commentators as liberal conservative, social conservative, right-wing populist and libertarian conservative.

In an effort to create a cohesive platform following its creation, the Conservative Party declared its founding core philosophies and principles to be fiscal accountability, upholding individual rights and freedom, belief in constitutional monarchy, the institutions of Parliament and Canada's democratic process, support for strong national defense, law and order, and Canada's history and traditions, and equal treatment for all Canadians.

Party platform and policies
In recent years, the Conservative Party has repeatedly campaigned on the following policies:

Culture
  Bilingualism
  Multiculturalism

Constitution
 Supporting Canadian federalism and opposing Quebec seperatism
 Maintaining Canada's constitutional monarchy
 Electing Senators, rather than appointing them
 Freedom of speech, expression, religion, press and conscience
 Respecting treaties signed with Indigenous Canadians
 Allowing Indigenous Canadians more self-governance over their land

Economic policy
 Supply management for certain dairy, poultry and eggs
 Extracting petroleum and natural gas
 Construction of pipelines
 A belief in the right to own private property
 Right to work

Environmental regulation
 Subsidies and grants for carbon capture technology
 Prohibiting the dumping of raw sewage into rivers
 Marine Protected Areas
 Pollution caps for industries

Firearms
 Maintaining the licensing system for firearm owners
 Maintaining the prohibition of short-barreled handguns and fully automatic firearms, including assault rifles
 Opposing the prohibition of long-barreled handguns and semi-automatic firearms

Foreign policy
 Supporting for most free trade agreements, including NAFTA, TPP and CETA
 CANZUK formation and membership
 Membership in NATO
 Membership in the United Nations
 Excluding abortion funding from foreign aid
 Support for Israel
 Recognizing Jerusalem as Israel's capital
 Prohibiting the Chinese government from owning Canada's 5G infrastructure

Healthcare and social programs
 Single-payer publicly funded healthcare
 Canada Pension Plan program
 Reducing the scope of the  CBC state broadcaster

Immigration
 Supporting immigration, including economic, family and refugee streams
 Eliminating birthright citizenship
 Opposing illegal immigration

Law-enforcement
 Mandatory minimum sentences for violent and sexual crimes
 Opposing the police abolition movement
 Creating a national sex offender registry
 Opposition to the legalization of recreational drugs

Life issues
 Opposing the expansion of assisted suicide to those solely suffering from mental illness
 Conscience rights for medical practitioners

Military
 Increasing military spending to 2% of Canada's GDP

Taxation and fiscal policy
 Income tax reductions
 Income splitting for families
 Business tax reductions
 Capital gains tax reductions
 Opposition to a carbon tax
 Tax simplification
 Balanced budget legislation
 Reducing the national debt
 Reducing  grants and subsidies to businesses

Domestic policies
In its current platform, the Conservative Party states that its core objectives are to protect the lives and property of ordinary citizens, promote democratic accountability and reform the senate to make it a fully elected chamber. While the party platform states it is open to debate over electoral reform, it also claims it will not support changing the current electoral system. The party calls for a "restoration of a constitutional balance between the federal and
provincial and territorial governments" in regards to Canadian federalism. The Conservative Party also advocates offering tax incentives, increased business investment and more political autonomy to assist and integrate Indigenous Canadian communities over state affirmative action. Historically, Conservative MPs have been somewhat divided on the issue of same-sex marriage in Canada, with individuals in the party arguing for and against. During debates on Bill C-38 in 2004 which would redefine the legal definition of marriage in Canada, a majority of Conservative MPs voted against when then leader Stephen Harper allowed a free vote. Under Harper's premiership, the party proposed reopening the debate into same-sex marriage but following a defeat of the motion in the House of Commons stated it would not seek to reopen it. In 2016, the Conservatives amended the party constitution to recognize and support same-sex marriage. Since the amendment, more Conservative MPs have come out in support of same-sex marriage and pledged to uphold LGBTQ rights. The Conservative leadership has supported changing the law to allow homosexuals to donate blood.

Economic and environmental policies
The party wants to keep the "Fiscal Balance" (which it introduced in its 2007 Budget while in government) in place and eliminate national debt. It also supports more simplified tax codes, controls on government spending and reductions in both personal and business taxes. Former party leader Erin O'Toole has listed economic recovery following the COVID-19 pandemic as a core priority for Canada. The party also supports abolishing the Carbon Tax. At the party's March 2021 policy convention, delegates voted 54%-46% to reject a proposal expand the party's existing climate change policies to include a statement that climate change is real, proclaim that Conservatives were "willing to act" on the issue, and calling for more innovation in green tech.

Foreign policy
The Conservative Party presently supports Canada's involvement in NATO and international trade agreements, including a CANZUK agreement that would enable mobilization of goods, trade and people between Canada, New Zealand, Australia and the United Kingdom. The party is also supportive of Israel and Conservative leaders Andrew Scheer and Erin O'Toole have both expressed support for moving Canada's embassy to Jerusalem. However, the party also supports taking a tough stance against the Chinese Communist Party and has pledged to prevent China from entering Canada's 5G Networks. The party also calls on Canada to encourage other Western nations to prevent Chinese government backed corporations from accessing and taking control of important media, energy, internet, defense and security related infrastructure.

Canadian identity, social policies and immigration
The party supports maintaining the Official Languages Act ensuring that English and French have equality of status in Canada. It also calls for the protection of Canada's history, culture and heritage. It also supports the re-establishment of the Office of Religious Freedom. The Conservative Party constitution also supports maintaining the constitutional Monarchy of Canada. The party currently calls for an immigration system that is "non-partisan, welcoming and well-managed" that encourages merit-based immigration and enticement of skilled workers to Canada to boost the economy whilst also taking a zero tolerance stance on illegal immigration and ensuring that immigrants speak English or French. The Conservatives also want to streamline the process of granting Canadian citizenship to foreign born children adopted by Canadian nationals, speed up the validation of refugee claims and give help to persecuted religious and sexual minorities whilst ensuring those who do not meet refugee status are escorted out of the country. Some MPs within the party have proposed a Canadian values test for prospective immigrants and long-term visitors, although this has not been adopted as a policy as a whole. Following the 2019–20 Hong Kong protests, several members of the party including former leader Erin O'Toole called on the Canadian government to grant asylum to fleeing Hong Kong pro-democracy protesters facing extradition orders to China. The party also proposes eliminating birthright citizenship unless one of the parents of a child born in Canada has permanent residency or Canadian citizenship.

Law and order
The Conservative Party generally supports a tough law and order stance. Presently, the party argues for a national register for convicted pedophiles, stricter sentences against repeat offenders, ending early release for violent felons and believes that victims of violent crime should have a say in National Parole Board decisions. The party also supports the creation of a cross-federal task force to tackle organized crime, human trafficking and threats to national security.

Gun ownership
The party states that it supports responsible gun ownership and will "not deprive Canadian Citizens of legally owned firearms" but also calls for cost-effective gun control programs including screening all individuals wishing to purchase firearms and increased enforcement against arms trafficking.

Regional conservative parties

The Conservative Party, while having no provincial wings, largely works with the former federal Progressive Conservative Party's provincial affiliates. However, there are other small "c" conservative parties with which the federal Conservative Party has close ties, such as the Saskatchewan Party and the British Columbia Liberal Party (not associated with the federal Liberal Party of Canada despite its name).

Cross-support between federal and provincial Conservatives is more tenuous in some other provinces. In Alberta, relations were sometimes strained between the federal Conservative Party and the provincial Progressive Conservative Party. The federal Tories' loss in the 2004 election was often blamed, in part, on then-Premier Ralph Klein's public musings on health care late in the campaign. Klein had also called for a referendum on same-sex marriage. With the impending 2006 election, Klein predicted another Liberal minority, though this time the federal Conservatives won a minority government. Klein's successor Ed Stelmach tried to avoid causing similar controversies; however, Harper's surprise pledge to restrict bitumen exports drew a sharp rebuke from the Albertan government, who warned such restrictions would violate both the Constitution of Canada and the North American Free Trade Agreement. The rise of the Wildrose Party caused a further rift between the federal Conservatives and the Albertan PCs, as some Conservative backbench MPs endorsed Wildrose. For the 2012 Alberta election, Prime Minister Harper remained neutral and instructed federal cabinet members to also remain neutral while allowing Conservative backbenchers to back whomever they chose if they wish. Wildrose candidates for the concurrent Senate nominee election announced they would sit in the Conservative caucus should they be appointed to the Senate.

After the 2007 budget was announced, the Progressive Conservative governments in Nova Scotia and Newfoundland & Labrador accused the federal Conservatives of breaching the terms of the Atlantic Accord.

As a result, relations worsened between the federal government and the two provincial governments, leading Newfoundland & Labrador Premier Danny Williams to denounce the federal Conservatives, which gave rise to his ABC (Anything But Conservative) campaign in the 2008 election.

Composition

National Council
The National Council of the CPC is its "highest governing body". The Council president, Robert Batherson—who was elected by CPC delegates on March 21, 2021, at the March 18–20 virtual policy convention to replace Scott Lamb—is the first president to come from the Atlantic provinces since the CPC was founded in 2003.  Batherson and the Council—along with the "campaign team working with the [Conservative] Fund"—will focus on ensuring that Erin O'Toole becomes prime minister in the next federal election.  While the National Council potentially has 21 members according to its constitution, there were no CPC candidates from either Nunavut or the Northwest Territories so these seats remain vacant until byelections are held, which will be in the next three months. The 21 seats—which are apportioned based on the of MPs it has in the House of Commons—include 4 from Ontario, 3 from Quebec, 2 from British Columbia, 2 from Alberta, 2 from Saskatchewan, 2 from Manitoba, 4 from Atlantic Canada, 1 from the Yukon Territories, 1 from Nunavut, and 1 from the Northwest Territories. On March 20, 2021, O'Toole proposed to the CPC Caucus at their annual meeting that they "embrace environment-friendly policies ahead of a likely federal election" in 2021. In preparation for the March 18–20 virtual policy convention, riding associations organized grassroot voting to determine which 34 resolutions would advance to plenary debate on potential changes to the CPC's Policy Declaration, with 6,500 votes cast for 196 policy proposals. The proposals to include the sentence, "we recognize that climate change is real. The Conservative Party is willing to act." in the Policy Declaration was rejected by 54% of delegates.

Geography
The Conservative Party has historically been strongest in the Canadian Prairies as well as rural Ontario. The party is strongest particularly in the provinces of Alberta and Saskatchewan, where it holds 30 out of 34 and all 14 federal seats respectively. It tends to be weaker in Quebec and Atlantic Canada, particularly Newfoundland and Labrador and Prince Edward Island.

Party leadership figures

Leader

Deputy Leader
The Deputy Leader is appointed by the Leader.

Party presidents
 Don Plett (2003–2009; interim until 2005)
 John Walsh (2009–2016)
 Scott Lamb (2016–2021)
 Robert Batherson (2021–present)

Parliamentary Caucus

House of Commons

Senate Caucus
The Conservative Party's senate caucus is the only political Senate Group that is formally linked to a Federal political party. Unlike the Independent Senators Group, Canadian Senators Group and the Progressive Senate Group, which are unaffiliated with any party in the House of Commons, Conservative senators form part of the national Conservative parliamentary caucus made up of members of both houses of parliament, though the senators do meet separately to discuss Senate-specific issues.

The caucus was created following the establishment of the modern Conservative Party of Canada on February 2, 2004, as a result of the merger of the Canadian Alliance and the Progressive Conservative Party of Canada. All but three Progressive Conservative Senators joined the Conservative Party and were redesignated as Conservative senators.

When in government, the leader of the caucus has been appointed by the national Conservative Party leader, serving as Prime Minister of Canada. When in Opposition the leader is elected by Conservative senators. Most recently, Don Plett was elected Senate Conservative leader on November 5, 2019, defeating one other candidate.

The first leader of the senate caucus, John Lynch-Staunton, also served as interim leader of the Conservative Party of Canada until a leadership election could be held.

The Senate Conservative Caucus and the Conservative MPs in the House of Commons jointly constitute the national Conservative caucus. Nevertheless, Denise Batters was permitted to remain a member of the Senate Conservative Caucus despite being expelled from the national Conservative caucus on November 16, 2021, for publicly opposing the leadership of Erin O'Toole.

Conservative leaders in the Senate

Electoral results

See also

 List of federal political parties in Canada
 Predecessor parties:
 Conservative Party of Canada (1867–1942)
 Progressive Conservative Party of Canada (1942–2003)
 Reform Party of Canada (1987–2000)
 Canadian Alliance (2000–2003)

Notes

References

Further reading

Archival holdings
Conservative Party of Canada – Canadian Political Parties and Political Interest Groups – Web Archive created by the University of Toronto Libraries
Conservative Party of Canada (French) – Canadian Political Parties and Political Interest Groups – Web Archive created by the University of Toronto Libraries

External links
 
 
 

 
2003 establishments in Canada
Conservative parties in Canada
Centre-right parties
Federal political parties in Canada
International Democrat Union member parties
Organizations based in Ottawa
Political parties established in 2003
Right-wing politics in Canada
Toryism